Napier Prison is a visitor attraction and former prison in Napier, New Zealand. Built in 1862 and decommissioned as a prison in 1993, it is the country's oldest prison complex.

History 
Napier Prison was constructed on Napier Hill in 1862 and was used until the early 1990s, being officially decommissioned in 1993. In addition to being a prison, the location was also used as an orphanage and a psychiatric unit. During the 19th century, four hangings were conducted at the prison. John Purcell was superintendent of the prison in its latter years.

Tourist attraction
In 2002, it was opened as a historical tourist attraction and has been open for entertainment and tours. It offers guided day and night tours by appointment and self-guided audio tours all day. It is the only building where it is possible to see the original path of the 1931 Hawke's Bay earthquake.

The prison was used as the venue for the filming of the 2006 television show Redemption Hill. It is also featured in the "Off the Rails" TV series.

There have been many reports of ghostly occurrences at the site such as unexplained footsteps, disembodied faces, doors opening and closing on their own, and the ghost of a murderer on the anniversary of his execution. The best-known former prisoner is Roland Edwards, a mass murderer whose spirit is said to haunt the area. He died on July 15 and paranormal activity is reputedly more prevalent around the anniversary of his death. Prolific New Zealand-based paranormal research team Haunted Auckland have made a few visits to the prison, conducting detailed overnight investigations, in the hopes of documenting evidence to back up some of the reports.

In 2011, a team from the television series Ghost Hunters International spent four days filming at the prison, which was criticized as "the lowest common denominator of a reality TV show".

References 

Prisons in New Zealand
Orphanages
Reportedly haunted locations in New Zealand
Buildings and structures in Napier, New Zealand
Museums in the Hawke's Bay Region
Prison museums in New Zealand
History museums in New Zealand
1860s architecture in New Zealand
Child-related organisations in New Zealand